2 Hell With Common Sense is a 1992 album by Power of Dreams. It was released as the follow up to their debut, Immigrants, Emigrants and Me, and included the singles 'There I Go Again' and 'Slowdown'.

Track listing
Raindown 
There I Go Again 
On and On 
She's Gone 
Untitled 
You Bring Me Flowers 
Understand 
Slowdown 
100 Seconds 
Happy Game 
Metalscape 
Blue Note 
Fall 
Cancer

References

Power of Dreams albums
1992 albums
Polydor Records albums